Dānapāla or Shihu (died 1017) was an Indian Buddhist monk and prolific translator of Sanskrit Buddhist sutras during the Song dynasty in China.

Life
A native of Oddiyana, he was a Vajrayana monk at Oddiyana's Vaijayanta Saṁghārama before arriving with his brother Devaśāntika in the Song dynasty capital Bianjing (now called Kaifeng) in 980 CE.  Emperor Song Taizong wanted the translation of more Indian Buddhist sutras. However, he was unsure about Dānapāla, Devaśāntika, and Dharmadeva's translation abilities. He then invited them to the Imperial Palace and tested their translation abilities with Sanskrit sutras kept at his palace. As they were all bilingual in Chinese and Sanskrit, the three satisfied Emperor Song Taizong's translation expectations. He then built a new translation bureau in 982 CE, called the "Institute for the Translation of Sutras" on the western side of the Taiping Xingguo Monastery. The emperor also bestowed honorary purple robes to Dānapāla and cohorts. The emperor bestowed the honorary title 'Great Master of the Manifested Teaching' on Dānapāla. Dānapāla was assigned as one of the key translators of the newly founded Institute. Along with his cohorts, he thus restarted translation of Sanskrit Buddhist texts in China after a 170-year hiatus. Devaśāntika and Dharmadeva, the two other chief translators at the Institute, passed away in 1000 CE and 1001 CE respectively. He became the only the chief Indian translator left at the Institute with only the assistance of Wei Jing (惟淨), a Chinese monk trained in Sanskrit at the Institute. It was not until 1006 with the arrival of Dharmapāla that he had another Indian translator to assist him in his work. Altogether he translated over 100 sutras, sastras and stotras, greatly contributing to the Chinese understanding of Vajrayana Buddhism and its popularization.

Legacy
The important Vajrayana root text Sarvatathāgata Tattvasaṃgraha Tantra was originally translated by Amoghavajra into Chinese during the 8th century CE, but it was an incomplete translation. Dānapāla was part of the team of translators who re-translated the entire Sarvatathāgata Tattvasaṃgraha Tantra. Dānapāla's contribution included the 1st and 14th-16th out of 18 sections. He also translated other Vajrayana sutras such as Māyopamasamādhi Sutra among others. Dānapāla also translated many non-Vajrayana texts such as the Nāgārjuna's Yuktiṣaṣṭikā, Mahāyānaviṃsaka, Dignāga's Prajñāpāramitāpiṇḍārthaḥ as well as a version of the Aṣṭasāhasrikā Prajñāpāramitā Sūtra, the Heart Sutra entitled 'The Holy Mother of [All] Buddhas Prajñāpāramitā Sūtra' and the Candropama Sūtra the Sanskrit version of Saṃyutta Nikāya 16.3.

Notes

References

Sources

 
 
 
 Sen, Tansen (2016). Buddhism, Diplomacy and Trade-The Realignment of India-China Relations (600-1400).

External links 
 Muller, A. Charles, ed. Digital Dictionary of Buddhism. Edition of 12/2/2018. (log in with userID "guest")

Year of birth missing
1017 deaths
10th-century Buddhists
11th-century Buddhists
10th-century Buddhist monks
11th-century Buddhist monks
Indian Buddhist monks
Song dynasty translators
Song dynasty Buddhist monks
Vajrayana
Sanskrit scholars
Indian emigrants to China
Sanskrit–Chinese translators
11th-century Indian translators